The Estadio de San José is a project to build a football stadium which will replace Estadio La Romareda in the neighborhood of San José, in Zaragoza, Spain as the home stadium of Real Zaragoza. The stadium will have a capacity of 43,000. 
The stadium architects is Joaquín Sicilia, and the cost is estimated between 125 million euros.

External links
 Video of the stadium
 Location new stadium wikimapia.org
 heraldo.es

References

Proposed stadiums
Football venues in Spain
Real Zaragoza
Sports venues in Aragon
Proposed buildings and structures in Spain